The following is a list of equestrian statues in the United Kingdom and includes equestrian statues, where a rider is mounted on a horse; and equine statues, where the horse is riderless, and/or the rider the is dismounted. The list includes statues situated in the United Kingdom, in addition to the Channel Islands.

England

Bristol

Liverpool

London

The Midlands

Northern England

Southern England

Northern Ireland

Scotland

Edinburgh

Glasgow

Wales

Channel Islands

See also

References

External links

Equestrian statues
United Kingdom
Equestrian statues